NGC 76 is a lenticular galaxy estimated to be about 320 million light-years away in the constellation of Andromeda. It was discovered by Guillaume Bigourdan from France in 1884 and its magnitude is 13.1.

References

External links
 

0076
001267
Andromeda (constellation)
18840922
Lenticular galaxies